The number of elections in Kansas varies by year.  Kansas has a gubernatorial election every four years.  Members of the state's United States congressional delegation run for election or re-election at the times set out in the United States Constitution.  Primary elections assist in choosing political parties' nominees for various positions.  On a regional basis, elections also cover municipal issues.  In addition, a special election can occur at any time.

In a 2020 study, Kansas was ranked as the 13th hardest state for citizens to vote in.

Voter qualifications
Subject to such exceptions as the Kansas Legislature may prescribe, all citizens of the United States, over the age of eighteen and who are residents of this state, may register to vote as a qualified elector of Kansas. A special provision allows seventeen-year-olds to register to vote if they will be eighteen before the next statewide general election. This does not allow them to vote in the primary or at any other election before attaining the age of eighteen.

Types of elections

General election
The general election for all elected state, district and country officers is held on the first Tuesday after the first Monday of November every two years. Those offices whose term expires the year following the general election must face election in that general election. For the statewide elected executive offices (the Governor of Kansas, Attorney General of Kansas, etc.), they must face election in the general election held two years after the last election for President of the United States. The most recent gubernatorial election in Kansas was held in 2018.

Candidates for United States Senator and United States Representative are elected in either the state general election as their term expires.

Primary election
A primary election must be held for a political party to nominate its candidates for the offices to the filled at the next general election. Such primaries are held on the first Tuesday in August of each year in which a general election is to be held. No candidate's name may be printed on the general election ballot unless such candidate has been nominated by his political party by a primary election. However, nonpartisan candidates need not seek primary election nominations in order to appear on the general election ballot.

Kansas operates a closed primary system in which only voters who have affiliated with the given political party may vote in that party’s primary and runoff primary elections. However, the chairman of each political party may allow registered Independents to vote in the given political party. However, under no circumstance may an Independent vote in more than one political party’s primary elections.

Registered voters not affiliated with either party 21 days before the election may choose to affiliate with a party on election day at the polling place.

Election provisions

Substitute candidates
In the event of the death of a political party's nominee for office prior to the date of the general election, a substitute candidate is permitted to have his name placed on the general election ballot. If the nominee was a candidate for a state office, the state central committee of the party affected must the Secretary of the State Election Board of the name of an alternative candidate to be placed on the general election ballot. Such notice must be submitted in writing within five days after the death has occurred and must be signed by at least two members of the political party's state central committee. 

If the death of the political party’s nominee should occur five days or more following the Runoff Primary Election date, a special general election shall be called by the Governor of Kansas. For such special general election, the candidates for office are the substitute candidate named by the central committee, the nominee of other political parties nominated for office, and any previously filed independent candidates.

Political parties
 Green Party of Kansas  
 Kansas Constitution Party 
 Kansas Democratic Party 
 Kansas Republican Party 
 Libertarian Party of Kansas 
 Natural Law Party of Kansas 
 Reform Party of Kansas

See also
United States presidential elections in Kansas

References

External links
Elections & Legislative at the Kansas Secretary of State official website
Kansas Election Statistics, 1899-2010 at the State Library of Kansas' KGI Online Library website

 
 
  (State affiliate of the U.S. League of Women Voters)
 

 
Government of Kansas
Political events in Kansas